Charles Ernest Hopton  (13 February 1861 – 20 December 1946) was Archdeacon of Birmingham from 1915 to 1944.

Hopton was born in 1861, educated at Clifton College, Hereford Cathedral School and St John’s College, Cambridge and ordained in 1885.
After curacies in Selly Oak and Redditch  he was  Vicar of Stretton Grandison   with Ashperton; St Stephen’s, Worcester; and then Moseley before his Archdeacon’s appointment.

References

1861 births
People educated at Clifton College
People educated at Hereford Cathedral School
Alumni of St John's College, Cambridge
Archdeacons of Birmingham
1946 deaths